Agaue is a genus of arachnids in the family Halacaridae. There are at least four described species in Agaue.

Species
 Agaue chevreuxi (Trouessart, 1889)
 Agaue hamiltoni Womersley, 1937
 Agaue magellanica Newell, 1971
 Agaue marginata Viets, 1950

References

Further reading

 
 

Trombidiformes